The Tsakona Arch Bridge is one of the world's longest multi-span arch bridges. It crosses the Tsakona Valley and it spans a dangerous location near Megalopoli, where in the last decades, there have been many landslides.

Construction 
The Tsakona Arch Bridge, with a length of 490 meters, was the last work that remained for the section Paradeisia – Tsakona axis Tripolis – Kalamata to be completed (made by the State and will be delivered to the consortium Moreas). As stated in the "Courage" by the project leader Nikos Donas, this bridge was one of the most difficult engineering projects, after the Charilaos Trikoupis Bridge. The project's cost was budgeted at €94 million but there were significant cost overruns. This was due largely to the complexity of building in the very challenging and unstable geologic conditions at the site. The original studies made for construction of the bridge had also underestimated the challenges associated with construction, this also caused budget and time overruns. As a result, the total cost finished at €131.5 million.

The bridge is supported at three points: one at each end (abutments) and one that is closer to the top of the pier. This last is the most important: it is basically a giant 'prefab', which ensures the stability of the bridge. From the pier starts the arch of the bridge, with a maximum height of 30 meters. The two arches, one on each side, support the metal part of the bridge on which the road is located.

Its construction started in 2008 and was opened for traffic in January 2016.

References

Arch bridges in Greece
Bridges completed in 2014
Toll bridges in Greece
Kalamata
Megalopolis, Greece
Bridges in Peloponnese (region)
2014 establishments in Greece